Bryansk is a city and the administrative center of Bryansk Oblast, Russia, situated on the River Desna,  southwest of Moscow. Population:

Geography

Urban layout

The location of the settlement was originally associated with navigable river-routes and was located in the area of the Chashin Kurgan, where the fortress walls were erected. For reasons that have not yet been clarified, the city changed its location and by the middle of the 12th century had established itself on the steep slopes of the right bank of the Desna on Pokrovskaya Hill. The foundations of the future urban development of the city were laid even earlier, when around the city-fortress in the 17th century after the Time of Troubles of 1598-1613 on the coastal strip at the foot of the Bryansk fortress the posadskaya "Zatinnaya Sloboda" was upset, and on the upper plateau, between Verkhniy Sudok and White Kolodez - the "Streletskaya Sloboda".

Somewhat earlier behind the posad (the territory between the fortress and the Peter-Pavlovsky monastery), after the annexation of Bryansk to the Moscow state and the organization of the Yamskaya service in 1503, the Yamskaya Sloboda appeared. Zatinnaya Sloboda is located on the site of the ancient "Zhitny Gorod" - a fortified territory of food warehouses and salt storages. Later, the settlement gave way to a cannon yard, on the site of which the Arsenal was located in the 18th century.

The general plan of the city of Bryansk plan laid the foundations for the development of the city in a regular system designed to streamline the existing buildings for centuries, limit the spontaneous growth of the city, and create a new community center. In the drawing, the territory of the upper plateau was covered with a geometrical grid of quarters formed by streets going down to the Desna and perpendicular to them. 

Three squares were "strung" on two of them: Sobornaya - on the coastal Moskovskaya street, Krasnaya gorodskaya - in the center of the plateau and Shchepnaya market - on the western border of the city (by the entrance to the present-day Dynamo stadium). The plan captures the historical layout. The city is spread out on the right bank of the Desna. It was a picturesque group of different-sized, irregularly shaped quarters. The city center did not stand out in terms of planning, it was defined by a fortress on Pokrovskaya Hill, dominating the city. 

Streets descending from the upper plateau were united into one, following along the bank of the Desna. The city was almost entirely wooden, with the exception of only a few stone (mainly religious) buildings. The street network included all buildings significant at that time. The central quarters were designated for the construction of stone public, commercial and residential buildings. Red (Krasnaya) Square was to be decorated with the buildings of public offices, magistrates and commercial institutions; the market square - built up with handicraft enterprises, smithies and shops.

The plan as revised in 1802 significantly increased the territory of the city and included in the regular system not only the coastal area and the area between Sudki, but also the Petrovskaya Gora area and Yamskaya Sloboda with Forest Sheds in the north and north-east, the area between the White Kolodez ravine and the Podar River on south; it increased the territory of the central part in the northwest behind the market square. The quarters were enlarged, the streets classified, and squares located on a larger scale to the territory of the city.

Smolenskaya Street - in common parlance Rozhdestvenskaya Gora (now Sovetskaya Street - Gagarin Boulevard) - is the main highway connecting the upland part with the coastal one. It connects three squares: Cathedral, Red and Sennaya (former Shchepnaya). Two other highways run in the longitudinal direction: Bolshaya Moskovskaya (now Kalinin Street) in the coastal part and Petropavlovskaya-Voskresenskaya Street (now Lenin Avenue), which unites the city in the upland part.

Petropavlovskaya and Voskresenskaya streets, continuing it, crossing the whole city, at the intersection with Trubchevskaya (now Krasnoarmeyskaya) street ended in a new, fourth square - Khlebnaya (on the site of the modern Partizanskaya Square, there was once a mill on this place). From here there were roads to Trubchevsk and Karachev. All squares were square. At the beginning of the 19th century, out of 867 houses in the city, only 25 were of stone; out of 17 stone churches there were 10. A little more than a dozen buildings built in the second half of the 18th century have survived to this day.

The unique architectural silhouette of the city, which was formed by the beginning of the 19th century, was skilfully expanded and enlarged by the end of the century. In the center, on the territory of the Spaso-Polikarpov Monastery, the Novopokrovsky Cathedral was erected (1862–1897), which emphasized the planning center of the district town with its scale. On the right flank there was a building of a trade and craft school, built by the architect N. A. Lebedev, which linked the building of the Arsenal plant and the Tikhvin church into a single chain of historical buildings.

The first isographic depiction of the city is a 1857 panorama from the left bank of the Desna, painted in watercolor by self-taught artist Gabriel Vasilyevich Khludov, a draftsman of the Bryansk Arsenal. In the center of the picture is Pokrovskaya Hill with the stone church of the same name and a bell tower, at the bottom right of the Arsenal building, then the Resurrection, Nikolskaya and Trinity churches, the ensemble of the Peter-Pavlovsky Monastery, and in the foreground - the Ascension Church of the Zaretskaya Sloboda.

It is not definitively known when the first Bryansk fortress appeared as a long-term fortification. The reports of the governor of 1629, and paintings from 1678, 1682, 1685, 1686 testify that the fortress on Pokrovskaya Hill was cut down, like in the old days, from oak logs and consisted of walls with towers. Inventories noted that the fortress was built on a native mountain. The city - "oak, chopped, covered with planks" - included a system of blind and drive-through towers connected by walls, supplemented by embankments and a wooden "standing prison in one log". 

The fortress had towers: Spasskaya, Arkhangelskaya, Bezymyannaya, Bushuevskaya, the first and second Voskresensky, Nikolskaya, Pyatnitskaya, Rukavnaya, Sudkovskaya, Prechistenskaya, Rozhdestvenskaya, Georgievskaya, Karachevskaya and Tainichnaya. The fortress of the "old" and "new" cities had a certain number of towers and a different amount of weapons.

The fortress was described at the beginning of the 18th century: "an ancient fortress in the city of Bryansk occupied the top of a small mountain, but with rather steep slopes and, in terms of its position relative to the city located on the right bank of the Desna, constituted a citadel. Its fortified fence was in an irregular quadrangle, at the corners of which there were small ledges. They were joined by a chain retransmission, placed on one of the ledges of a raised area."

History

The first written mention of Bryansk, as Debryansk, dates to 1146 in the Hypatian Codex. Etymologically, it derives from "дъбръ", a Slavic word for "ditch", "lowland", or "dense woodland"; the area was known for its dense woods, of which very little remains today. Local authorities and archaeologists, however, believe that the town had existed as early as 985 as a fortified settlement on the right bank of the Desna River.

Bryansk remained poorly attested until the 1237–1242 Mongol invasion of Rus'. It was the northernmost of the Severian cities in the possession of the Chernigov Rurikids. After the Mongols murdered Prince Mikhail of Chernigov in 1246 and his capital was destroyed, his son Roman Mikhailovich moved his seat to Bryansk. In 1310, when the Mongols sacked the town again, it belonged to the Principality of Smolensk.

Grand Duke Algirdas of Lithuania acquired Bryansk through inheritance in 1356 and gave it to his son, Dmitry the Elder. Until the end of the century Grand Duke Jogaila of Lithuania, Grand Duke Vytautas of Lithuania, the future Grand Duke Švitrigaila of Lithuania, and Grand Duke Yury of Smolensk contested control of the town.

The Grand Duchy of Moscow conquered Bryansk following the Battle of Vedrosha in 1503. The town was turned into a fortress which played a major role during the Time of Troubles (1598–1613). During the Time of Troubles the Polish–Lithuanian Commonwealth occupied the town in 1610, and it remained in Polish hands as part of Smolensk Voivodeship until the Truce of Deulino in 1634. In 1709 Tsar Peter the Great incorporated Bryansk into the Kiev Governorate, but Empress Catherine the Great deemed it wise to transfer the town to the newly-formed Oryol Governorate in 1779. She also promulgated the town's coat of arms (August 1781).

In the 17th and 18th centuries the economy of Bryansk, which had become a regional trading center, was based on the Svenskaya fair, the largest in European Russia. The fair took place annually under the auspices of the nearby Svensky Monastery. After the town started to manufacture cannon and ammunition for the Imperial Russian Navy in 1783, Bryansk evolved from a regional market town into an important industrial center for metallurgy and textiles. The city's population exceeded 30,000 by 1917.  In 1812 Napoleon's Grande Armée fought the Russians in Bryansk and in Oryol during the French invasion of Russia.

In 1918 the Belarusian People's Republic claimed Bryansk, but Bolshevik forces took the town in 1919. During World War II the German Wehrmacht captured Bryansk and encircled the Soviet 3rd,13th and 50th armies. The town remained under Axis occupation from October 6, 1941 to September 17, 1943, with the city left heavily damaged by fighting. About 60,000 Soviet partisans were active in and around Bryansk, inflicting heavy losses on the German Army. In 1944, soon after its liberation, Bryansk became the administrative center of Bryansk Oblast.

In 2016 the city council approved a new general city plan, which called among others for laying of a new route from Burov Street along the Bolva River to Vokzalnaya Street with the intersection of the railway and Bolva. In the southern direction, it is proposed to extend the road along the Desna to the Fokinsky District to Moskovsky Prospekt, construction of a road from the Black Bridge along the Karachizh ravine with the intersection of Stanke Dimitrova Avenue to Sakharova Street, reconstruction of Sakharova Street to the bypass road and the R120 highway, as well as development of the area of the old airport (area of Gorbatova, Stepnaya streets).

A large fire was noted at an oil depot on April 25, 2022. Speculation was that it might have been a result of military action during the 2022 Russian invasion of Ukraine.

Administrative and municipal status
Bryansk is the administrative center of the oblast. Within the framework of administrative divisions, it is, together with three work settlements (Belye Berega, Bolshoye Polpino, and Raditsa-Krylovka), incorporated separately as Bryansky Urban Administrative Okrug—an administrative unit with the status equal to that of the districts. As a municipal division, Bryansky Urban Administrative Okrug is incorporated as Bryansk Urban Okrug.

Economy
Today's Bryansk is an important center for steel and machinery manufacturing, and is home to many large factories. The main industries are machine building, metalworking, chemical, electrical equipment, electronics, wood, textile and food industries, locomotives, diesel engines, freight cars, motor graders, pavers and other road equipment, agricultural equipment, construction materials, and garments.

Transportation

Since 1868, there is a railway connection between Bryansk and Moscow. The city has railway stations: Bryansk Orlovsky and Bryansk-Lgovskiy (Bryansk Bryansk -I and -II, respectively), Ordzhonikidzegrad; Street Bus Station and Peresvet Bezhitsa bus station.  west of the city lies the Bryansk International Airport.

Passenger traffic carried by bus (more than 1,400 cars on 54 permanent urban routes), trolley on 10 regular routes, uses (36 routes), as well as commuter trains and railcars. The cost of public transport (trolley buses) is 16 rubles, and buses, 20 rubles.

Notable people

Born in Bryansk
The famous poet Fyodor Tyutchev was born in Ovstug family estate, at that time part of the Oryol Governorate, now part of Bryansk Oblast.
Russian cosmonaut Viktor Afanasyev
 Shot put athlete Svetlana Krivelyova
 Sculptor and architect Naum Gabo
 Classical pianist Valentina Igoshina
 Chess Grandmaster Ian Nepomniachtchi
 Swimmer Victoria Kaminskaya
 MMA fighter Vitaly Minakov
 Former Russian professional footballer Andrei Grechishko
 Singer Maxim Troshin

Additional
Bulgarian communist leader Stanke Dimitrov (Marek) died in an aviation accident near the city.
The writer Leonid Dobychin spent most of his adult years there.

Climate
Bryansk has a humid continental climate (Köppen climate classification Dfb).

Culture and education

Bryansk has two universities, three theaters, and a technical academy.

Twin towns – sister cities

Bryansk is twinned with:

 Severodvinsk, Russia
 Oryol, Russia
 Omsk, Russia
 Izhevsk, Russia
 Grozny, Russia
 Penza, Russia
 Kaluga, Russia
 Gomel, Belarus
 Mogilev, Belarus
 Minsk, Belarus
 Bogatić, Serbia
 Karlovo, Bulgaria
 Dupnitsa, Bulgaria
 Győr, Hungary
 Akmenė, Lithuania
 Auce, Latvia
 Soroca, Moldova
 Comrat, Moldova

 (Until 2022)  Konin, Poland - On March 4, 2022, due to the Russian invasion of Ukraine, Konin broke the agreement.

See also
Lokot Autonomy

References

Notes

Sources

External links

Official website of Bryansk City Administration 
Bryansk Business Directory 
Official website of the Bryansk Council of People's Deputies 
Educational portal of Bryansk 
The murder of the Jews of Bryansk during World War II, at Yad Vashem website.

 
Bryansky Uyezd
Severians
Holocaust locations in Russia